Brandon Erwin (born November 22, 1975 in Denton, Texas) is a racecar driver who has raced in stock car and sprint car events.  In 2001, he competed in 4 Indy Racing League contests for McCormack Motorsports. In 2003 he competed in the Indy Pro Series, finishing 11th in points with a best race result of 3rd in his first race. In 2005 he drove a winged sprint car in Texas and surrounding states. His current hometown race track is the Devils Bowl Motor Speedway dirt track in Mesquite, Texas. He is currently working in law and real estate.

Racing record

American Open Wheel
(key)

IndyCar results

References

External links
Brandon Erwin's IRL stats at ChampCarStats.com

1975 births
Living people
IndyCar Series drivers
Indy Lights drivers
Sportspeople from Denton, Texas
Racing drivers from Texas

Arrow McLaren SP drivers